Christophe Wargnier (born 25 May 1980) is a French coach who currently coach as a defender for Division d'Honneur club Abbeville. He previously played professionally with Amiens between 1999 and 2002, and has also assisted Pontivy, Roye and Châtellerault.

External links

Christophe Wargnier profile at foot-national.com

1980 births
Living people
People from Eu, Seine-Maritime
French footballers
Association football defenders
Amiens SC players
GSI Pontivy players
US Roye-Noyon players
SO Châtellerault players
Ligue 2 players
SC Abbeville players
Sportspeople from Seine-Maritime
Footballers from Normandy